Nelson Navarro (born 19 January 1949) is a Curaçaoan jurist and politician. He was Minister of Justice of Curaçao from December 2012 to December 2016.

Biography
Navarro was born in 1949 and went to high school in Curaçao. In 1976 he earned a degree in Dutch law at the Leiden University in the Netherlands. He returned to Curaçao the same year to work as a paralegal at the Central Bureau of Judicial and General Affairs. Three years later he moved once again to the Netherlands to work as a civil servant at the tax service and to study about customs and tariffs. Once he finished the course he went to work at the Central Bureau of Judicial and General Affairs in Curaçao again. He became deputy-head of the organisation in 1982. He held this position until 1987. In 1987 he became a lawyer, and from that year until 2006 he worked at several law firms.

Political career
In 2006 Navarro was one of the co-founders of the political party Forsa Kòrsou. Navarro himself obtained a seat in the Estates of the Netherlands Antilles the same year. After the dissolution of the Netherlands Antilles in 2010 Navarro returned to his work as a lawyer. In 2012 he was invited to join the "Task cabinet" of Prime Minister Daniel Hodge as Minister of Justice. He was confirmed with the rest of the cabinet on 31 December 2012. After the cabinet of Hodge resigned, a new cabinet under Ivar Asjes was formed. Under Asjes Navarro was kept as Minister of Justice and confirmed on 7 June 2013. Navarro offered his resignation to the Estates of Curaçao after a suspect in the murder investigation around Helmin Wiels killed himself in a police cell complex located in Barber, Curaçao. The suspect had days before been relocated from the highly guarded Marinekazerne Suffisant. After giving an explanation to the Estates Navarro retained his position.

In June 2016 it was revealed that Navarro on 8 February 2015 had drunk coffee with rat poison in it while being at the government building Fort Amsterdam. The amount of poison was not enough to be lethal. Earlier notices reported that Navarro was to be assassinated by Venezuelan hitmen while attending a carnaval parade. Navarro was warned and did not attend the parade.

Navarro was replaced by Ornelio Martina in the Hensley Koeiman cabinet which was installed on 23 December 2016.

References

1949 births
Living people
Leiden University alumni
Ministers of Justice of Curaçao
Curaçao lawyers
Members of the Estates of the Netherlands Antilles